Alberto Valtierra Martínez (19 September 1931 – 15 February 2013) was a Spanish rower. He competed in the men's coxed four event at the 1960 Summer Olympics.

Notes

References

External links
 
 

1931 births
2013 deaths
Spanish male rowers
Olympic rowers of Spain
Rowers at the 1960 Summer Olympics
Sportspeople from Vigo